The following episodes are from Mystery Hunters.

Season 1 (2002 - 2003)

Season 2 (2004 - 2005)

Season 3 (2005 - 2006)

Season 4 (2008 - 2009)

Mystery Hunters